Leopold Löwenheim [ˈle:o:pɔl̩d ˈlø:vɛnhaɪm] (26 June 1878 in Krefeld – 5 May 1957 in Berlin) was a German mathematician doing work in mathematical logic. The Nazi regime forced him to retire because under the Nuremberg Laws he was considered only three quarters Aryan. In 1943 much of his work was destroyed during a bombing raid on Berlin. Nevertheless, he survived the Second World War, after which he resumed teaching mathematics.

Löwenheim (1915) gave the first proof of what is now known as the Löwenheim–Skolem theorem, often considered the starting point for model theory.

Leopold was the son of Ludwig Löwenheim, a mathematics teacher at the polytechnic in Krefeld and Elizabeth Röhn, a writer. In 1881 the three of them left Krefeld first for Naples and then Berlin where Ludwig was a private scholar working on a comprehensive account of the influence of Democritus on modern science. Although he hoped this would gain him a teaching job at Humboldt University Ludwig died in 1894.

Publications 

 Translated as "On possibilities in the calculus of relatives" in Jean van Heijenoort, 1967. A Source Book in Mathematical Logic, 1879–1931. Harvard Univ. Press: 228–251.

References

Further reading
 Brady, Geraldine, 2000. From Peirce to Skolem. North Holland. Contains a detailed exegesis of the proof in Löwenheim (1915), and discusses how Thoralf Skolem simplified that proof and extended the scope and generality of the theorem.

External links
 Löwenheim, Leopold at encyclopedia.com
 

1878 births
1957 deaths
20th-century German mathematicians
German logicians
People from Krefeld
German philosophers
German male writers